José Luis Noriega (born 14 September 1969) is a former professional tennis player from Peru.

Biography
Noriega, who grew up in the Peruvian capital Lima, was a four-time All-American collegiate tennis player at the University of San Diego (USD). Known by his nickname "Tato", he attended USD from 1989 to 1992 and amassed a 138-30 win-loss record across singles and doubles.

From 1992 to 1994 he competed on the professional tennis tour, where he had a best ranking of 161 in the world. He won a Challenger title in Brazil in 1993 and made the final round of US Open qualifying the following year. His two ATP Tour main draw appearances for singles came at the 1994 Volvo International in New Haven and the Colombia Open in the same year.

He featured in a total of nine Davis Cup ties for Peru, the last in 1996.

Challenger titles

Singles: (1)

See also
List of Peru Davis Cup team representatives

References

External links
 
 
 

1969 births
Living people
Peruvian male tennis players
San Diego Toreros men's tennis players
Sportspeople from Lima
Tennis players at the 1987 Pan American Games
Pan American Games competitors for Peru
20th-century Peruvian people
21st-century Peruvian people